Basey, officially the Municipality of Basey, is a 1st class municipality in the province of Samar, Philippines. According to the 2020 census, it has a population of 56,685 people.

On 8 November 2013, Basey was one of the places heavily devastated by Super Typhoon Haiyan, leaving more than 200 people dead.

Etymology
The town's name is pronounced "Basai" or "Basay", not "basÉY". This mispronunciation was propagated by American soldiers in the early days of the American colonial period. There is no "ey" sound in the Waray-Waray language. Basay is from the Waray word mabaysay, meaning "beautiful".

Geography

Barangays
Basey is politically subdivided into 51 barangays. In 1957, the sitio of Cancoral was converted into the barrio of Roxas.

Climate

Demographics

Economy

Tourism
The town of Basey is famous for its beautiful Sohoton Caves, whose inner chamber features stalactites, stalagmites, and an underground river. The town is also known for artistically woven decorative mats called Banig. Tourists buy these mats as souvenir items.

References

External links

 Basey Profile at PhilAtlas.com
 [ Philippine Standard Geographic Code]
 Philippine Census Information
 Local Governance Performance Management System

Municipalities of Samar (province)
Basey